The 2008 FORU Oceania Cup was a rugby union competition for countries and territories in Oceania with national teams in the developmental band.

The tournament was played as a straight knockout, which was won by Niue. The Band 1 teams from Oceania teams (Australia, New Zealand, Fiji, Samoa, and Tonga) do not participate in the Oceania Cup.

First round

Western Zone 

 1.   qualified for final 
 2.

Eastern Zone 

Ranking:
 1.   qualified for final 
 2.

Final

See also
 FORU Oceania Cup

Notes
 The score on the Rugby International match report was 29–20 to New Caledonia, but the FORU web site originally recorded it as 32–20 to New Caledonia (since corrected).

References

2008
2008 rugby union tournaments for national teams
2008 in Oceanian rugby union